Deep in the Valley  (also known as American Hot Babes in the UK) is a 2009 romantic comedy written and directed by Christian Forte, son of 1950s and 1960s teen icon Fabian.

Plot 
Lester Watts (Chris Pratt) works at a liquor store, happily selling alcohol to minors while spending his spare money on his pornography collection.  His best friend since third grade, Carl (Brendan Hines) works a corporate job at his British fiancée's family's company.  He wants to leave the job and work somewhere else, but she angrily tells him he has no choice and that he must stay; it is clear that she is completely in control of the relationship.

That night, the two friends have a beer when a delivery comes in the form of a vintage porn viewer machine which plays the films of Diamond Jim (Christopher McDonald).  They step inside and it transports them to a land where everyone acts like they are in a pornographic film.  The police arrest them, led by Rod Cannon (Scott Caan) but they escape and are hidden from the police by Bambi Cummings (Rachel Specter) at her sorority house, Tri-Pi.

They elude the police while Bambi and Carl fall in love with each other.  Eventually, they go to Diamond Jim's pool party where Carl decides to get transported home and Lester decides to stay.  It is revealed that Lester is Diamond Jim's son.  Back home, Carl breaks up with his overbearing girlfriend and Bambi is transported to him, reuniting them. Meanwhile, Lester takes over his father's porno empire.  After the closing credits, it is revealed that Rod was transported to Lester's old job at the liquor store.

Cast 
 Chris Pratt as Lester Watts
 Brendan Hines as Carl
 Scott Caan as Rod Cannon
 Rachel Specter as Bambi Cummings
 Kim Kardashian as Summa Eve
 Denise Richards as Autumn Bliss
 Christopher McDonald as Jim "Diamond Jim"
 Blanca Soto as Suzi "Diablo"
 Tracy Morgan as "Busta Nut"
 Charlotte Salt as Tracy
 Olivia O'Lovely as Busta Nut Cocktail waitress

Soundtrack 
Somebody Do It - Written and Performed by Darius Holbert
The Slide - Written and Performed by Jake Keller (as Jacob Keller)
On The Bus - Written and Performed by Jake Keller (as Jacob Keller)
Push, Push (Lady Lightning) - Written and Performed by Bang Camaro.

References

External links 
 
 

2000s sex comedy films
2009 comedy films
2000s American films
2009 films
2000s English-language films
American sex comedy films
Films set in Los Angeles
Films shot in Los Angeles
American independent films
Films about pornography